Mount Richardson may refer to:

Canada 
Mount Richardson (Alberta) in 29-16-W5, in Alberta
Mount Richardson Provincial Park, provincial park, in British Columbia
Mount Richardson (Quebec), in Gaspésie, Quebec

New Zealand 
Mount Richardson (New Zealand, Canterbury), mount in Canterbury, New Zealand
Mount Richardson (New Zealand, Otago), mount in Otago, New Zealand
Mount Richardson (New Zealand, Southland), mount in Southland, New Zealand

Elsewhere 
Mount Richardson (Antarctica), mount in Antarctica